During the 2003–04 English football season, Everton competed in the Premier League (known as the Barclaycard Premiership for sponsorship reasons).

Season summary
In 2002–03, all the talk at Goodison Park was about how David Moyes was restoring some pride to the blue half of Merseyside thanks to a seventh-place finish. 2003–04, however, was quite a different story, as Everton struggled at the wrong end of the Premiership and finished the season one place above the drop zone with 39 points (a tally which in many seasons has seen teams relegated, even under the 38-game format), albeit the abysmal seasons suffered by all of the bottom three clubs meant that Everton rarely looked to be in any serious danger of relegation.

18-year-old striker Wayne Rooney was England's key player in their run to the quarter-finals of Euro 2004, but fast-growing rumours that he was about to be sold to Manchester United put Everton's top flight future under increasing doubt.

Final league table

Results
Everton's score comes first

Legend

FA Premier League

FA Cup

League Cup

First-team squad

Left club during season

Reserve squad

Statistics

Appearances

Notes

Everton F.C. seasons
Everton